Cacotherapia is a genus of snout moths. It was described by Harrison Gray Dyar Jr. in 1904 and is known from the United States, Guatemala, Mexico, and Panama.

Species
 Cacotherapia angulalis (Barnes & McDunnough)
 Cacotherapia bilinealis (Barnes & McDunnough, 1918)
 Cacotherapia demeridalis (Schaus, 1924)
 Cacotherapia flexilinealis Dyar, 1905
 Cacotherapia interalbicalis (Ragonot, 1891)
 Cacotherapia lecerfialis (Barnes & Benjamin, 1925)
 Cacotherapia leucocope (Dyar, 1917)
 Cacotherapia nigrocinereella (Hulst, 1900)
 Cacotherapia poecilostigma (Dyar, 1914)
 Cacotherapia ponda Dyar, 1907
 Cacotherapia unicoloralis (Barnes & McDunnough, 1913)
 Cacotherapia unipuncta (Dyar, 1913)

References

Cacotherapiini
Pyralidae genera